Central Township is an inactive township in Jefferson County, in the U.S. state of Missouri.

Central Township was established in 1842, and named for its central location.

References

Townships in Missouri
Townships in Jefferson County, Missouri